The following highways are numbered 17F:

United States
 Nebraska Link 17F
 New York State Route 17F (former)

See also
List of highways numbered 17